Federico Gómez de Salazar y Nieto (Toledo, 29 September 1912 – Madrid, 24 January 2006) was a Spanish military officer who fought for the Nationalist faction in the Spanish Civil War.

Biography 
Gómez de Salazar entered the General Military Academy of Zaragoza in 1929, where he was trained by General Francisco Franco, obtaining the rank of ensign in 1932 and that of lieutenant in 1933. He was promoted to captain on March 24, 1937, being assigned to the Group "Ceuta" Nº 3 of the Regulares.

He participated in the Spanish Civil War, in which the Military Medal was granted to him for conduct displayed in the Regulares. He also fought on the Eastern Front of World War II, in the ranks of the Blue Division, or the 250th Infantry Division of the German Wehrmacht; he was assigned to the 262nd Regiment.

In 1944 he was promoted to the rank of commander, obtaining the diploma of General Staff of the Army in 1946, and later, the diploma of General Staff of the Navy. In 1957 he was promoted to lieutenant colonel and in 1965 to colonel. He was promoted to general in 1970, major general in September 1973 and to lieutenant general in May 1976.

Gómez de Salazar was named Governor-General of Spanish Sahara in June 1974. He achieved great public notoriety when, on 6 November 1975, he faced the Green March; the event, organized by King Hassan II of Morocco, saw approximately 350,000 unarmed Moroccan civilians invading the territory. There he would have to organize a preventive defense, estimating that in case of violence there would be about 30,000 casualties, taking responsibility after an emergency evacuation and demilitarization operation after the signing of the Madrid Accords, process that would conclude in January 1976.

In 1976, back in Spain and being assigned to the General Staff, Gómez de Salazar presided over the Council of War which tried the defendants belonging to the clandestine Military Democratic Union (Unión Militar Democrática, UMD), held at Hoyo de Manzanares (Madrid) from 8 March.

Units and destinations 
Among the units in which Gómez de Salazar served are the 37th Infantry Regiment, the Regulares of Ceuta, the General Staff of the 31st Division, the Central General Staff, the military attachés of the Spanish embassies in Turkey, Greece and Iran, the Infantry Regiment of Badajoz and the Higher School of the Army. Likewise, he was chief of the General Staff of the Captaincy General of Canary Islands and head of the División Mecanizada «Brunete» n.º 1. In the field of military teaching he worked as a professor at the Infantry Academy, the General Staff College and the Naval War College.

Marriage, offspring and death 
He was married to Maria Jesus Girón, daughter of José Antonio Girón, with whom he had two children, and died in Madrid on 24 January 2006, at the age of 93.

References 

1912 births
2006 deaths
People from Toledo, Spain
People from the Province of Toledo
Spanish military personnel
Spanish colonial governors and administrators
History of Western Sahara
Spanish captain generals
Spanish military personnel of the Spanish Civil War (National faction)
Spanish military personnel of World War II
Grand Crosses of the Royal and Military Order of San Hermenegild